The Rush Creek Open Space Preserve or just the Rush Creek Preserve is a nature reserve and open space near Novato, California. The 522 acre lot of public land has a host of hiking trails as well as a marsh in center, and is bordered by various marshes and shallow lakes owned by the California Department of Fish and Game. Due to the proximity of marshes and shallow lakes, all kinds of birds and waterfowl live in the area, with close to 200 species. This makes the preserve a popular destination for birdspotters. Open 24 hours a day, the preserve is also popular for running, hiking, biking, dog walking, and horse riding, as all are allowed on most of the trails. A rare Blue Oak woodland is also located near the Bahia Marsh.

History 
What is now the preserve started as private land, but the 632 acre lot was purchased by the Marin Audubon Society. Once they purchased it, they donated most of the land to several government entities, with the majority of it going to the Marin County Open Space District and the California Department of Fish and Wildlife to become the preserve. However, they still own ‏‏‎ ‎‏‏‎ ‎‏‏‎ ‎‏‏‎ ‎‏‏‎ ‎‏‏‎ ‎‏‏‎ ‎‏‏‎ ‎‏‏‎ ‎‏‏‎ ‎‏‏‎ ‎‏‏‎ ‎‏‏‎ ‎‏‏‎ ‎‏‏‎ ‎‏‏‎ ‎‏‏‎ ‎‏‏‎ ‎‏‏‎ ‎‏‏‎ ‎‏‏‎ ‎‏‏‎ ‎‏‏‎ ‎‏‏‎ ‎‏‏‎ ‎‏‏‎ ‎‏‏‎ ‎‏‏‎ ‎‏‏‎ ‎‏‏‎ ‎‏‏‎ ‎‏‏‎ ‎‏‏‎ ‎‏‏‎ ‎‏‏‎ ‎‏‏‎ ‎‏‏‎ ‎‏‏‎ ‎‏‏‎ ‎‏‏‎ ‎‏‏‎ ‎‏‏‎ ‎‏‏‎ ‎‏‏‎ ‎‏‏‎ ‎‏‏‎ ‎‏‏‎ ‎‏‏‎ ‎‏‏‎ ‎‏‏‎ ‎‏‏‎ ‎‏‏‎ ‎‏‏‎ ‎‏‏‎ ‎‏‏‎ ‎‏‏‎ ‎‏‏‎ ‎‏‏‎ ‎‏‏‎ ‎‏‏‎ ‎‏‏‎ ‎‏‏‎ ‎‏‏‎ ‎‏‏‎ ‎‏‏‎ ‎‏‏‎much of the land around Bahia Marsh.

Nature reserves in California